Zelezniki may refer to:
Železniki, town in Slovenia
Żeleźniki (disambiguation), villages in Poland